The 1980–81 Cypriot First Division was the 42nd season of the Cypriot top-level football league. Omonia won their 10th title.

Format
Fourteen teams participated in the 1980–81 Cypriot First Division. All teams played against each other twice, once at their home and once away. The team with the most points at the end of the season crowned champions. The last two teams were relegated to the 1981–82 Cypriot Second Division.

The champions ensured their participation in the 1981–82 European Cup and the runners-up in the 1981–82 UEFA Cup.

Changes from previous season
APOP Paphos and Evagoras Paphos were relegated from previous season and played in the 1980–81 Cypriot Second Division. They were replaced by the first team of the 1979–80 Cypriot Second Division, Nea Salamina.

Stadia and locations

League standings

Results

See also
 Cypriot First Division
 1980–81 Cypriot Cup
 List of top goalscorers in Cypriot First Division by season
 Cypriot football clubs in European competitions

References

Sources

Cypriot First Division seasons
Cyprus
1980–81 in Cypriot football